William Whitaker (1923–1995) was an English professional footballer who played as a defender in the Football League.

References

1923 births
1995 deaths
Footballers from Chesterfield
English footballers
Association football defenders
Chesterfield F.C. players
Middlesbrough F.C. players
King's Lynn F.C. players
English Football League players